Fiction Family Reunion is the second studio album by Fiction Family, which is the collaboration between Switchfoot frontman and solo artist Jon Foreman, Nickel Creek guitarist and solo artist Sean Watkins, Tyler Chester, and Aaron Redfield. It was released on January 29, 2013, through the indie record label, Rock Ridge Music.

Critical reception

Track listing

Personnel

Fiction Family
Jon Foreman – vocals, guitar
Sean Watkins – vocals, guitar
Tyler Chester – bass guitar
Aaron Redfield – drums

Additional personnel
Fiction Family – production, engineering
Chris Rondinella – engineering
Adam Hawkins – mixing
Hank Williams – mastering
Tyler Halford – assistant
Andy Barron – design, photography

Charts

References

2013 albums
Fiction Family albums
Lowercase People Records albums
Rock Ridge Music albums